Lauren Marie Scherf (born 7 March 1996) is an Australian professional basketball player for the Perth Lynx of the Women's National Basketball League (WNBL).

Professional career
Scherf began her professional career in 2013 with the Dandenong Rangers. She played four seasons with the Rangers, where she won the WNBL Rookie of the Year Award in 2015. She played two seasons with the Canberra Capitals between 2017 and 2019, and then two with the Sydney Uni Flames in 2019–20 and the 2020 Hub season.

On 30 April 2021, Scherf signed with the Perth Lynx for the 2021–22 WNBL season. On 3 June 2022, she re-signed with the Lynx for the 2022–23 WNBL season. On 7 January 2023, she had 33 points and 14 rebounds in a 75–64 win over the Sydney Flames, with 27 of her points coming in the first half. Later that month, she played her 200th WNBL game.

National team career
Scherf has represented Australia at the 2011 FIBA U16 Oceania Championship, 2012 FIBA U17 World Championship, 2013 FIBA U19 World Championship (winning bronze), and the 2013 Australian Youth Olympic Festival (winning gold).

References

External links
FIBA profile
"It's not a bird or a plane, it's Super Scherf rescuing Perth! Lauren Scherf dominating WNBL season for Lynx" at thewest.com.au

1996 births
Living people
Australian women's basketball players
Canberra Capitals players
Centers (basketball)
Dandenong Rangers players
Medalists at the 2017 Summer Universiade
Medalists at the 2019 Summer Universiade
Perth Lynx players
Power forwards (basketball)
Sydney Uni Flames players
Universiade gold medalists for Australia
Universiade medalists in basketball
20th-century Australian women
21st-century Australian women
People from East Melbourne
Sportswomen from Victoria (Australia)
Basketball players from Melbourne